EMAS is a global offshore contractor and provider of integrated offshore solutions to the oil and gas (O&G) industry and operating brand for Ezra Holdings. The business was founded in 1992 and is headquartered in Singapore. It began in Asia Pacific in the maritime industry with a fleet of vessels. The company quickly expanded, listing EMAS on the Singapore Exchange in 2003, and adding fabrication facilities in Vietnam. Over the next few years, EMAS added its construction and production division, listed EOC Limited on the Oslo Stock Exchange in 2007 and created an energy division, offering onshore drilling, offshore drilling and well services. In 2011, EMAS embarked on a highly strategic acquisition of Aker Marine Contractors, a subsea construction and installation technology group.

EMAS was promoted to Mainboard on 8 December 2005.

History
EMAS was founded in 1992 by Mr Lee Kian Soo. Headquartered in Singapore, 
EMAS is now an offshore service provider, with offices in 16 locations across 5 continents.

1992 Founded. Incorporated EMAS Offshore to provide management and operation of offshore support vessels
2003 Launch of Initial Public Offering (IPO) in Singapore 
2005 Acquisition of Vietnam Fabrication Yard, Asian Technical Maritime Services Ltd (ATMS) through wholly owned subsidiary HCM Logistics Limited & Promoted to SGX Main Board 
2007 Buys strategic stake of 21.83% for S$16.5m in SGX-listed Nylect Technology Limited to extend its oil & gas support services activities 
2008 Listing of Production & Construction division, EOC Limited, on the Mainboard of the Oslo Stock Exchange raising approximately US$ S$260 million 
2011 Acquisition of Aker Marine Contractors AS (AMC) from Aker Solutions AS (a subsidiary of Oslo Bǿrslisted Aker Solutions ASA)
2011 Singapore's EMAS wins three charters worth $73 million
2017 Singapore's EMAS shares suspended from trading on the Singapore Stock Exchange.

The Company
EMAS operates four main business segments.

EMAS AMC, EMAS's subsea construction division has over 40 years in design, construction, transportation and field installation. The group has completed a wide range of global offshore installation and subsea construction projects, including the transportation and installation of the world's largest man-made structure. Service offerings include subsea construction, IMR (inspection, maintenance & repair), floater and FPSO (floating, production, storage & offloading) installation, SURF installation, pipelay & heavylift, floatover installation and decommissioning.

EMAS Energy provides well intervention and drilling services both onshore and offshore. The range includes work-over, drilling, fluid pumping, nitrogen and pipeline & process services.

EMAS Marine manages and operates a fleet of anchor handling, towing & supply vessels, anchor handling tugs, platform supply vessels, and fast crew utility boats. These
vessels support the O&G industry in a wide range of offshore operations throughout the oilfield life cycle.

EMAS Production, under approximately 46.5%-owned EOC Limited, owns and operates FPSO facilities, offering services such as FPSO conversion management and the operation & maintenance of production facilities. It has the capability to design and provide FPSO/FSO mooring & riser systems and turrets, and fluid transfer systems.

The Group offers offshore fabrication and construction, logistics, engineering and support services out of Vietnam from its yard facilities in Ho Chi Minh City and Vung Tau, as well as in Hinna, Norway and Houston, USA.

Old News

On November 29th, 2011 EMAS secured its first contracts in Brazil, whereby it will charter out four vessels for an average of 4.25 at a total price of US$231 million.

EMAS Achieves Half-Billion-Dollar Milestone In Sales For FY11, Group Orderbook Exceeds Record US$1.2B.

EMAS AMC will perform subsea work in the Atlantis field located in the Gulf of Mexico. This is the second contract awarded by BP to EMAS AMC for work on the Atlantis field.

EMAS AMC has been awarded a contract to carry out offshore installation services for US supermajor Chevron in the Gulf of Thailand.

Management
Mr. Cavan Chan serves as the Executive Chairman of EMAS while Mr. Lee Chye Tek Lionel serves as the Managing Director. As Managing Director, Mr. Lionel Lee manages its business and oversees day-to-day operations.

Acquisition of Aker Marine Contractor
EMAS announced the completion of the acquisition of Aker Marine Contractors (AMC) of Houston on March 1, 2011. AMC was valued at US$250 million. Ezra has settled the transaction by paying Aker Solutions US$50 million in cash, $100 million in shares in Ezra Holdings Ltd, and $50 million in a convertible bond with maturity after 36 months. The share instruments have been valued on weighted average price per share over the last 30 days preceding signing. The final $50-million-plus interest will be settled in cash on and subsequent to delivery of the AMC Connector vessel. Upon delivery of AMC Connector, Ezra will take 50 percent ownership in the vessel owning company. The other half will remain under Aker Solutions ownership.

References

Engineering companies of Singapore